Amin Joseph (born April 26, 1980) is an American actor and producer. He stars as Jerome Saint on John Singleton's crime drama Snowfall.

Early life
Joseph was born to Antiguan parents in Queens, New York City, but was raised in Harlem, New York City. In 2004, he made his small screen debut in the action drama Rage and Discipline. His career took off from there, with over five dozen film and television credits in just twelve years.

Career

Amin Joseph's star is on the rise and he is continuing to make his mark in Hollywood. He appeared on the big screen in Paramount's film reboot of Baywatch (2017), with Dwayne Johnson, Zac Efron and Priyanka Chopra. He currently stars in FX's television series Snowfall. The hour-long drama, executive produced by John Singleton, is set in Los Angeles in the 1980s and covers the early days of the crack-cocaine epidemic.  He also had a role in Johnny Depp's City of Lies where he plays corrupt LAPD officer Kevin Gaines (police officer), a thriller about the investigation of the murders of Tupac Shakur and The Notorious BIG.

Joseph has been featured in many major films including The Expendables and Homefront, both Lionsgate action hits written by Sylvester Stallone; G.I. Joe: Retaliation with Bruce Willis and Dwayne Johnson; the film festival darling Dope, which premiered at the Sundance Film Festival in competition and went on to screen at the Cannes Film Festival and the Deauville American Film Festival in 2015; The Gambler with Mark Wahlberg; and Frank Darabont's 2007 horror film, and The Mist, based on the story by Stephen King, among many others. He reunited with Darabont for both FX's hit series The Shield as well as a recurring role on TNT's L.A. Noir. He also starred in two Cinemax series, Zane's Sex Chronicles and Zane's The Jumpoff, both written by New York Times bestselling author Zane.  His additional TV credits include appearances on major shows such as Transparent, Sons of Anarchy, Southland, N.C.I.S., and CSI: Miami, among others.

His production company, Dark Energy Pictures, specializes in action, horror, and Sci-fi content spanning digital, television, and feature films. The company's recent film Call Me King, an international action thriller, embodies their focus on multicultural, lingual, and ethnic content.

His charitable work includes time with the grassroots organization The Awareness Movement in Los Angeles. The organization focuses on creating content in order to facilitate a positive dialogue between local communities and law enforcement as well as giving a voice to disenfranchised voters in urban communities. He also volunteers with several schools throughout Los Angeles, providing scene study classes with a focus on African American classic playwrights.

Joseph is a graduate of Rice High School and Howard University. He is a protégé of the World-famous Apollo Theater in his hometown Harlem, NYC, where he interned during his youth. He resides in Los Angeles.

Filmography

Film

Television

References

External links 

Amin Joseph at AMG

1980 births
Living people
African-American male actors
American male actors
Howard University alumni
21st-century African-American people
20th-century African-American people